Military conscription of people with disabilities has occurred on various occasions historically.

Cases 
Below are listed known cases of the drafting of disabled persons.
 In Japan during the Second Sino-Japanese War, more than 480 people with intellectual disabilities were conscripted.
 In the United States during the Vietnam War, there was a disability draft under the Johnson Administration, called Project 100,000. Men who had previously been rejected from military service due to physical or mental disabilities were re-classified and sent to the frontlines in Vietnam.
 In North Korea: The conscription physical examination has eased the criteria for military service suitability due to low height, and even short stature persons (mostly 140 to 150 centimeters. 142 centimeters, 145 centimeters. etc.) are conscripted. The criteria for exemption from conscription for short people were 138 centimeters or less, and there were times when the criteria for conscription exemption for short people were not applied.

See also 
 Conscription
 Disability abuse
 McNamara fallacy
 Project 100,000

References

Conscription
Abuse
Disability